Dracochela is an extinct genus of fossil stem group pseudoscorpions, containing the single species Dracochela deprehendor. It is known from cuticle fragments of nymphs found in the mid-Devonian (Givetian–Eifelian) Panther Mountain Formation of New York State. Dracochela signifies 'dragon claw".

References
  (1991): The first Paleozoic pseudoscorpions (Arachnida, Pseudoscorpionida). American Museum Novitates 3009. Abstract - PDF
 Judson, Mark L.I.  (2012). "Reinterpretation of Dracochela deprehendor (Arachnida: Pseudoscorpiones) as a stem-group pseudoscorpion" Palaeontology, 55.2 (March 2012) pages 261–283, redescribes the type material and an addition palpal fragment.

Pseudoscorpion genera
Prehistoric arachnid genera
Paleozoic arachnids
Late Devonian animals
Devonian arthropods of North America